is a 1970 Japanese jidaigeki film directed by Daisuke Itō. It is based on Ryōtarō Shiba's novel of the same title.

The film depicts chronicles the life of Sakamoto Ryōma and people around him.

Cast
 Kinnosuke Nakamura as Sakamoto Ryōma
 Toshirō Mifune as Gotō Shōjirō
 Tatsuya Nakadai as Nakaoka Shintarō
 Sayuri Yoshinaga as Oryō
 Noboru Nakaya　as Takechi Hanpeita
 Shigeru Kōyama as Katsu Kaishū
 Keiju Kobayashi as Saigō Takamori
 Isao Yamagata as Yamada
 Ryosuke Kagawa as Tōkichi
 Katsuo Nakamura as Kondō Chōjirō
 Shinjirō Ehara as Miyoshi Shinzō
 Atsushi Watanabe as Suga

References

External links

1970 films
Samurai films
Jidaigeki films
1970s Japanese-language films
Films directed by Daisuke Itō (film director)
Films set in Bakumatsu
1970s Japanese films